Loverboy  is a 1989 American comedy film starring Patrick Dempsey, Kirstie Alley, Carrie Fisher, Kate Jackson, and Barbara Carrera.

Plot
Randy Bodek is a rebellious college slacker, living with his girlfriend Jenny Gordon.  His father, furious over Randy's lack of direction or work ethic, forces Randy to come back home and get a job.  Randy eventually finds work as a pizza delivery driver at Señor Pizza, but his pitiful earnings will not allow him to fund college on his own and he despairs of being able to return to Jenny next semester.  In his capacity as delivery driver, he soon makes the acquaintance of a middle-aged, wealthy Italian woman, Alex Barnett, who pampers and seduces him.  She and Randy enjoy a quiet, brief, passionate affair.  During the affair, Randy's increasingly stylish appearance, unusually chipper demeanor and gifts being delivered by Randy's handsome Italian co-worker, Tony (signed "Love, Alex"), inspires Randy's father to believe his son is gay.

Eventually, Alex must return to Italy.  Randy is disappointed; he has enjoyed his relationship with Alex, both for the lavish gifts of money and expensive clothing, and for the experience at pleasing women he can bring to his relationship with Jenny upon returning to college.  Alex tells him on their last night together that the next time Señor Pizza receives a delivery order for pizza with extra anchovies, it will be her summoning him again.

However, the next order for extra anchovies comes from an unhappily married Asian woman, Kyoko Bruckner.  Further orders come from Dr. Joyce Palmer, director of a women's health practice, and isolated aspiring photographer Monica Delancy. Randy's relationships with these women lead him to better understand women's wants and needs.

Through Kyoko and Monica's acquaintances, and the women Joyce recommends to Randy among her patients, Randy soon has a thriving escort business based around the "extra anchovies" order, which he manages to conceal from Señor Pizza's management. Eventually, the three women's husbands become suspicious. In an attempt to pin down who is having sex with their wives, the three husbands go through their wives' financial statements and credit card bills, leading them to Señor Pizza to confront the delivery boy who is apparently having sexual relations with all three of their wives.

Meanwhile, Jenny has come to town to surprise Randy, and has learned from Jory Talbot, a rival of Randy's, that Randy is seeing other women without her knowledge.  Randy is not there, having received an order for extra anchovies—from his mother. He escapes the situation before she sees him, and passes the pizza off to Tony, with instructions that they are out of anchovies. Randy then learns from his other co-worker Sal about Jenny's visit and Jory having told her about the other women.  Randy and Jory go out back of Señor Pizza to fight, but the husbands arrive, intent on assaulting Randy.  They grab Randy and are about to rough him up when Harry (Kyoko's husband) realizes that Randy is Joe Bodek's son, as he and Joe are co-workers; Joe had told Harry during a semi-drunken conversation that he believes Randy to be gay, and Harry dismisses him as a suspect on those grounds.  The husbands then assault an unsuspecting Jory.

Randy confesses to Jenny about the reasons he agreed to become a paid escort.  Jenny is hurt and uncertain she wants to continue their relationship, but agrees to accompany him to his parents' anniversary party. The husbands follow Jory to the party, where the party dissolves into melee, resulting in their arrest for assault. Jory is humiliated when he discovers that his own mother was one of Randy's customers. Joe forgives Randy and agrees to fund college again and Randy finally introduces Jenny to his parents.

Cast

Reception
Loverboy received mixed reviews from critics, as it holds a 50% rating on Rotten Tomatoes from 10 reviews.

References

External links

 
 
 

1989 films
1980s sex comedy films
Adultery in films
American sex comedy films
1980s English-language films
Films about male prostitution in the United States
Films directed by Joan Micklin Silver
Films scored by Michel Colombier
Films shot in Los Angeles
Films with screenplays by Leslie Dixon
TriStar Pictures films
Teen sex comedy films
1989 comedy films
1980s American films